18 B Sides + DVD is a compilation album by American electronic musician Moby. The album's first disc is a CD featuring nine B-sides from his 2002 album 18, as well as four new songs. The second disc is a DVD featuring a live concert at the Pyramid Stage at the Glastonbury Festival on June 29, 2003, various outtakes and studio demos taken from the Play and 18 studio sessions, a megamix with eleven remixes of six different songs, and music videos for five singles from 18. The DVD also contains an additional non-musical feature entitled Highlights from Moby TV, consisting of several short skits.

The compilation was released in the United States in a CD-style case, and was alternatively released in the United Kingdom in a DVD-style case under the title 18 DVD + B Sides.

Track listing

CD

DVD

Personnel 
Credits for 18 B Sides + DVD adapted from album liner notes.

 Moby – engineering, mixing, production, instruments, writing
 Azure Ray – vocals on "Landing"

Live footage
 Janet Frazer Cook – direction
 Ben Challis – production (exec.)
 Mark Cooper – production (exec.)
 Alison Howe – production

Music videos
 Joseph Kahn – direction ("We Are All Made of Stars")
 Style Wars – direction ("In This World" and "Sunday (The Day Before My Birthday)")
 Simon and Jon – direction ("Jam for the Ladies")
 Wayne Isham – direction ("Extreme Ways")
 Seb Ronjon – direction ("Jam for the Ladies" (contest winner))

Charts

References

External links 
 
 

2003 compilation albums
Moby compilation albums
B-side compilation albums
Mute Records compilation albums
V2 Records compilation albums
2003 live albums
Mute Records live albums
Live video albums
Music video compilation albums
Mute Records video albums
Albums produced by Moby